Mehdi Mabrouk is a Tunisian politician. He served as the Minister of Culture under Prime Minister Hamadi Jebali.

Biography

Academic career
He has taught sociology at the University of Tunis, with lectures on illegal immigration and youth issues. He has also been a scholar at the Tunisian Center of Economic and Social Studies. In June 2011, he said Tunisia was ill-equipped to handle the wave of immigration from Libya.

Mabrouk is also the Chief of the Tunis Office of the Arab Center for Research and Policy Studies, and regularly speaks at some of its conferences.

Minister
On 20 December 2011, after former President Zine El Abidine Ben Ali was deposed, he joined the Jebali Cabinet as Minister of Culture. He has spoken at the Istanbul World Political Forum.

Bibliography
Voile et sel: culture, foyers et organisation de la migration clandestine en Tunisie (2010)

References

Living people
Tunisian sociologists
Academic staff of Tunis University
Government ministers of Tunisia
Year of birth missing (living people)